Launch Complex 19 (LC-19) is a deactivated launch site on Cape Canaveral Space Force Station, Florida  used by NASA to launch all of the Gemini crewed spaceflights. It was also used by uncrewed Titan I and Titan II missiles.

LC-19 was in use from 1959 to 1966, during which time it saw 27 launches, 10 of which were crewed. The first flight from LC-19 was on August 14, 1959 and ended in a pad explosion, extensively damaging the facility, which took a few months to repair. The first successful launch from LC-19 was also a Titan I, on February 2, 1960. After being converted for the Titan II ICBM program in 1962, LC-19 was later designated for the Gemini flights. After the program concluded in December 1966, LC-19 was closed down.

The Gemini white room from the top of the booster erector has been partially restored and is on display at the Air Force Space and Missile Museum located at Complex 26.

Gallery

See also

Gemini Program
Gemini 1
Gemini 2
Gemini 3
Gemini 4
Gemini 5

Gemini 7
Gemini 6A
Gemini 8
Gemini 9A
Gemini 10
Gemini 11
Gemini 12
Titan I
Titan II

References

Cape Canaveral Space Force Station
Project Gemini
Launch complexes of the United States Space Force